The following is a list of places and locations named after American activist and writer Frederick Douglass.

Places

Neighborhoods
 Douglass, Memphis, Tennessee
 Douglass (Washington, D.C.)
  Douglass Place, Baltimore
 Douglas Park, Arlington, VA

Parks and sites
 Frederick Douglass National Historic Site – Anacostia, Washington, D.C.
 Frederick Douglass Square Historic District, Boston
 Douglass Park, Chicago, Illinois
 Frederick Douglass Memorial Park, Staten Island, New York
 Frederick Douglass Bandstand at Lynn Commons, Lynn, Massachusetts
 Frederick Douglass Park, 1-19 Exchange Street, Lynn, Massachusetts

Streets, bridges, and other infrastructure
 Frederick Douglass Circle – located at the Northwest corner of Central Park at the foot of Frederick Douglass Boulevard and of Cathedral Parkway in the New York City borough of Manhattan
 Frederick Douglass Boulevard – a continuation of Eighth Avenue north of Frederick Douglass Circle, starting at 110th Street
 Frederick Douglass Memorial Bridge, Anacostia
 Frederick Douglass–Susan B. Anthony Memorial Bridge, Rochester, New York
 Fredrick Douglass Avenue-Runs from Main St to Warren Ave in Brockton, Massachusetts.
 Frederick Douglass - Greater Rochester International Airport

Schools

Maryland
 Frederick Douglass High School (Baltimore, Maryland)
 Frederick Douglass High School (Prince George's County, Maryland)
 Sojourner–Douglass College

Missouri
 Frederick Douglass High School (Columbia, Missouri)
Douglass High School (Webster Groves, Missouri), segregated school that operated from 1926 to 1956
Douglass University, St. Louis

Oklahoma
Frederick A. Douglass High School (Oklahoma), Oklahoma City, Oklahoma
Douglass School (Lawton, Oklahoma), listed on the National Register of Historic Places in Comanche County, Oklahoma

Tennessee
 Douglass High School (Memphis, Tennessee)
Douglass High School (Kingsport, Tennessee), African-American high school closed in 1966

Virginia
Douglass High School (Leesburg, Virginia)
Douglass School (Bristol, Virginia), listed on the National Register of Historic Places in Bristol, Virginia
Frederick Douglass Elementary School (Leesburg, Virginia)

Other states
 Douglass High School (Atlanta)
 Frederick Douglass Academy, West Harlem, New York City
 Douglass Academy for Young Men, Detroit
 Douglass High School (Texas), Douglass, Texas
 Douglass Junior and Senior High School, Huntington, West Virginia
 Douglass School (Lexington, Kentucky), listed on the National Register of Historic Places in Fayette County, Kentucky
 Frederick Douglass Elementary School (Cincinnati, OH)
 Frederick Douglass High School (Evansville, Indiana)

Other 
 Frederick Douglass Book Center: New York City

References

Douglass, Frederick
Frederick Douglass